The Sheraton Centre Toronto Hotel is a 1300-room, 43-story hotel in Downtown Toronto, Ontario, Canada, opened in 1972. It is the second-tallest all-hotel building in Toronto, after the Delta Toronto Hotel.

History
The hotel opened on October 16, 1972 as the Four Seasons Sheraton Hotel, a joint venture between Sheraton and Toronto businessman Issy Sharp's Four Seasons chain. At the time, it was the second-largest hotel in Toronto, behind only the Royal York Hotel. Sharp was unhappy with the partnership, and sold his 49 percent share in the hotel in 1976 for $18.5 million, and it was renamed The Sheraton Centre of Toronto. The name has since been modified slightly to the Sheraton Centre Toronto Hotel. Marriott International, Sheraton's parent company, sold the hotel to Brookfield Asset Management in 2017 for $335 million.

The new hotel was built as part of an urban renewal project connected to the Toronto City Hall and Nathan Phillips Square project. The site of the Sheraton was considered a "commercial slum" with two burlesque theatres, pawn shops and a cinema. The site was expropriated by the Old City of Toronto in 1964 and the site cleared in 1965. The site was later sold for the construction of the Four Seasons Sheraton Hotel.

The hotel was a host venue for the World Hockey Summit in 2010.

Description
The hotel consists of three connected buildings located between Queen, York, and Richmond streets: the three-floor entrance, the eleven-floor building on Richmond Street, and the main building, which has 43 floors and faces Queen Street, looking directly at the Toronto City Hall.  The project was developed by John B. Parkin Associates. The inner yard contains a landscaped garden with a waterfall, which was designed by a Canadian architect, J. Austin Floyd. The hotel has 171,716 sq ft of total event space, the largest hotel convention facilities in Toronto, including a ballroom with a capacity of 3500. The hotel lobby serves as one of the nodes of the PATH network of pedestrian tunnels. There was a two screen cinema on the lower level until the 1990s. The hotel is connected to the square by a walk bridge over Queen Street West. The transmitter for CIRR-FM is located atop the hotel.

See also
 List of tallest buildings in Toronto
 Four Seasons Centre

References

External links
Sheraton Centre Toronto Hotel (official website)

1972 establishments in Ontario
Brutalist architecture in Canada
Hotel buildings completed in 1972
Hotels established in 1972
Hotels in Toronto
Sheraton hotels
Skyscraper hotels in Canada
Skyscrapers in Toronto